Palo Alto station (also called Palo Alto Transit Center) is an intermodal transit center in Palo Alto, California. It is served by Caltrain regional rail service, SamTrans and Santa Clara VTA local bus service, Dumbarton Express regional bus service, the Stanford University Marguerite Shuttle, and several local shuttle services. Palo Alto is the second-busiest Caltrain station after San Francisco, averaging 7,764 weekday boardings by a 2018 count. The Caltrain station has two side platforms serving the two tracks of the Peninsula Subdivision and a nearby bus transfer plaza.

The San Francisco and San Jose Railroad was built through then-empty land north of Mayfield in 1863. The first Palo Alto station was opened in 1890 to serve the then-newly established Stanford University. It was replaced by a larger depot in 1896. The Southern Pacific Railroad opened a new station in 1941 as part of a grade separation project. Designed by John H. Christie, it was constructed in the Streamline Moderne style to match the railroad's Daylight series of streamlined passenger trains. Intercity service to Palo Alto ended in 1971; the Peninsula Commute service continued and was renamed Caltrain in 1985. The station building was listed on the National Register of Historic Places as Palo Alto Southern Pacific Railroad Depot in 1996.

History

Early stations

The San Francisco and San Jose Railroad opened from San Francisco to Mayfield in 1863, and to San Jose the next year. Several decades later, Leland Stanford founded the new town of Palo Alto to the north of Mayfield. Palo Alto station was opened in 1890 to serve the then-newly established Stanford University. The original structure had open sides supported by posts; it was enclosed in 1893 for use as a waiting room. A temporary building for ticket sales, telegraphy, and baggage was constructed between the waiting room and a retrofitted former boxcar. (That boxcar had previously been used as the Los Gatos station, and was later used as the Los Altos station).

A new station, costing $5,500, was completed in 1896. Substantially larger than the previous depot, it had five wooden arches styled after the Richardsonian Romanesque masonry arches of the university campus. The architecturally-plain station was never locally popular, and calls came for its replacement as early as the 1920s.

Streamline Moderne station

In 1939, the Southern Pacific Railroad (SP) began a grade separation project in Palo Alto. A temporary station on the east side of the tracks was built in 1939, and the cornerstone for a new station building was laid on October 20, 1940. The new station was opened with a parade on March 8, 1941. The whole project cost $700,000, most of which was paid for by the federal government.

The new station building was constructed in the Streamline Moderne style, in contrast to the earlier Mission Revival and Spanish Colonial Revival buildings in Palo Alto designed by Birge Clark. Designed by SP architect John H. Christie, the building's aesthetics were inspired by the railroad's Daylight series of streamlined passenger trains. The larger building housed the ticket office and waiting room, with the smaller baggage room to the north. The waiting room contains a 1944 mural by John McQuarrie (who painted murals in several SP stations) showing facts and events in the history of California.

The station's design is typical of the Streamline Moderne movement; it has porthole windows, substantial use of glass blocks, and horizontal "speed lines" on the exterior. A shelter was built on the eastern (northbound) platform; it was later modified with more open ends and larger windows. Three pedestrian underpasses were built: one north of the station building and a pair flanking University Avenue. Although the relocated right-of-way was built to fit four tracks, only three tracks were built; a narrow island platform (typical of SP stations) was located between the western and center tracks.

Modern changes

Intercity service to Palo Alto lasted until May 1, 1971, when Amtrak took over service from the private railroads. The San Francisco–Monterey Del Monte was discontinued, while the San Francisco–Los Angeles Coast Daylight was rerouted via Oakland. SP Peninsula Commute local service (renamed Caltrain in 1985) continued to stop at Palo Alto. In 1982, the station building was refurbished and landscaping was added. The station was added to the National Register of Historic Places as an example of the Streamline Moderne style on April 18, 1996.

In April 1999, the former baggage building was converted into a free staffed bike station with 80 spaces. It was closed on October 27, 2004, for asbestos removal as part of a $1.2 million renovation of the station buildings. The bicycle station reopened on February 27, 2007, as a paid and unstaffed facility with 96 spaces.

The bus plaza adjacent to the station building was renovated in 2005. From 2008 to 2009, Caltrain constructed the $35 million Palo Alto Stations Improvement Project at the Palo Alto and California Avenue stations. At Palo Alto, the northern underpass was modified to make it accessible, allowing the nearby pedestrian level crossing to be closed. The platforms (shortened significantly since the station was built) were rebuilt and lengthened. New lighting, shelters, and message signs were installed. Palo Alto is the second-busiest Caltrain station after San Francisco, averaging 7,764 weekday boardings by a 2018 count.

Future plans
A 2007 city report called for additional expansion and renovation of the station area in conjunction with the California High-Speed Rail project. The rail line would be widened to four tracks with two island platforms—an additional northbound track would be built east of the existing northbound platform, and a replacement southbound platform would be built between two southbound tracks. University Avenue would be split into a one-way pair flanking a new city park. The bus plaza would gain a western entrance with direct access to El Camino Real. In 2013, the Santa Clara Valley Transportation Authority proposed relocating the bus plaza onto both sides of University Avenue.

Among the possibilities being considered for eliminating grade crossings in Palo Alto is a long tunnel under the downtown area.

Bus connections

Palo Alto station is also a major transfer point for regional and local bus systems:
City of Palo Alto shuttles: Crosstown, Embarcadero
Dumbarton Express: DB
East Palo Alto shuttle
Menlo Park midday shuttle
Samtrans: ECR, 280, 281, 296, 397
Stanford Health Care TECH shuttle
Stanford Marguerite: MC, N, O, P, RP, S, SE, X, Y

Dumbarton Express, SamTrans, VTA, and some Marguerite buses stop in a bus plaza northwest of the station building (adjacent to the southbound platform). Some Marguerite buses instead stop south of the station building. Most other shuttles and some Marguerite buses stop near the northbound platform.

References

External links

Caltrain - Palo Alto

Caltrain stations in Santa Clara County, California
Santa Clara Valley Transportation Authority bus stations
Former Southern Pacific Railroad stations in California
National Register of Historic Places in Santa Clara County, California
Railway stations in the United States opened in 1890
Railway stations on the National Register of Historic Places in California
Buildings and structures in Palo Alto, California
Streamline Moderne architecture in California
United States bike stations